This Is a Love Song EP is the second EP by Australian indie rock band Little Birdy, and the follow-up to the Little Birdy EP. It was released on 1 March 2004 and debuted at No. 22 on the Australian Singles Chart on 8 March 2004. "This Is a Love Song" polled at No. 40 on Triple J's Hottest 100 of 2004.

Track listing

Charts

References

Little Birdy albums
2004 EPs